M4 is one of the five lines of the Bucharest Metro.

History 
Construction of the line started in September 1989, shortly before the Romanian Revolution. The tunnels were built up to where Parc Bazilescu is today. Construction was abandoned afterwards and was resumed later on in the 90's. The first section of the M4 opened on 1 March 2000 from Gara de Nord to 1 Mai. 
After many years of delays the next section to Parc Bazilescu was finally opened on 1 July 2011. Parc Bazilescu was not in the initial plan and was only built to open the section quicker.

In 2013, construction started on the final  section of the M4 to Străulești, along with Străulești depot. On 3 September 2015 tunneling work was completed. The service was extended with two more stations, Laminorului and Străulești, which opened on 31 March 2017.

In 2022, the Southern extension from Gara de Nord to Gara Progresul was approved.

Rolling stock 
Despite being one of the newest lines on the network, the M4 runs old Astra IVA trains.

References

External links

 Metrorex vrea sa extinda Magistrala 4 cu 2 statii at stirileprotv.ro 
 Metrorex a publicat anuntul de intentie privind organizarea unei proceduri de achizitie a lucrarilor de structura pentru obiectivul „Magistrala 4. Racord 2. PLS Zarea – Laminorului – Străulești”. at metrorex.ro 
 Linia de metrou de la Gara de Nord spre 1 Mai va ajunge pana in zona lacului Străulești at incont.ro 

Bucharest Metro Lines
Railway lines opened in 2000